Alicia Esperanza Navas Villanueva (born 26 August 1991) is a Guatemalan retired footballer who played as a goalkeeper. She has been a member of the Guatemala women's national team.

International career
Navas capped for Guatemala at senior level during the 2014 CONCACAF Women's Championship.

References

1991 births
Living people
Guatemalan women's footballers
Guatemala women's international footballers
Women's association football goalkeepers